The 1962 California lieutenant gubernatorial election was held on November 6, 1962. Democratic incumbent Glenn M. Anderson narrowly defeated Republican nominee George Christopher with 51.42% of the vote.

Primary elections
William McKesson, the Los Angeles County district attorney, unsuccessfully challenged incumbent lieutenant governor Glenn M. Anderson in the Democratic Party's primary. Anderson won a landslide victory over McKesson and minor candidate Brainin Treskunoff. McKesson's campaign saw him lodge strong personal attacks against Anderson in the closing days of the campaign. Herbert L. Phillips of The Sacramento Bee saw McKesson's campaign's performance as "surprisingly weak".

Mayor of San Francisco George Christopher won landslide victory in the Republican primary in a two-way race against State Senator John F. McCarthy (the minority caucus leader in the California State Senate).

General election

Candidates
Glenn M. Anderson, Democratic 
George Christopher, Republican

Results

References

California
1962
Lieutenant